Nenad Vučković (born 23 August 1980) is a Serbian handball player for Dinamo Pančevo.

Club career
Over the course of his career that spanned more than two decades, Vučković played for Crvena zvezda (1999–2004), Chambéry (2004–2007), MT Melsungen (2008–2017), Vojvodina (2017–2018), before joining Dinamo Pančevo.

International career
A Serbia international since its inception, Vučković made his major debut for the national team at the 2009 World Men's Handball Championship. He was also a member of the team that won the silver medal at the 2012 European Men's Handball Championship.

Honours
Crvena zvezda
 Handball League of Serbia and Montenegro: 2003–04
 Handball Cup of Serbia and Montenegro: 2003–04
Vojvodina
 Serbian Handball Super League: 2017–18

References

External links

 EHF record
 LNH record
 Olympic record

1980 births
Living people
Sportspeople from Pula
Serbs of Croatia
Serbian male handball players
Olympic handball players of Serbia
Handball players at the 2012 Summer Olympics
RK Crvena zvezda players
RK Vojvodina players
Handball-Bundesliga players
Expatriate handball players
Serbian expatriate sportspeople in France
Serbian expatriate sportspeople in Germany